Matson is a suburb of Gloucester, in the unparished area of Gloucester, in the Gloucester district, in the county of Gloucestershire, England. In 1931 the parish had a population of 40.

History 

Unlike neighbouring villages, such as Brookthorpe and Upton St Leonards, Matson is not mentioned in the Domesday Book. It appears to have been a part of Kings Barton at the time of the survey. The origins of the name are unclear but early versions recorded include Matesknolle, Mattesdune and Matesden and it is likely that the names refer to Robinswood Hill, a large hill which lay entirely within the ancient parish of Matson and on the flanks of which the village lies.

It has been suggested that iron ore was mined from Robinswood Hill in Saxon times although there is little evidence for this. A spring called the Red Well rising just above Matson is ferruginous in nature.

Matson House, a large manorial house, was the headquarters of King Charles during the Siege of Gloucester. It subsequently became the property of Major General William Selwyn in 1679. It is now (2017) the Selwyn Care Home.

On 1 April 1935 the parish was abolished and became part of Gloucester, Brookthorpe and Upton St. Leonards.

1950s to present 

Today, Matson is best known for the council estate that was built in the village after the Second World War.
Parmjit Dhanda, former MP for Gloucester (2001-2010), lived in Matson with his family. Matson contains a ski slope, a pub, a shopping parade, doctor's surgery, Neighbourhood Project and several churches.

Matson police station was closed in 1994. In 2009 plans were revealed for the construction of a new motorway service station. Following the planning process and a judicial review Gloucester services was built near Matson with the northbound services opening on May 7, 2014 and the southbound services due to open in May 2015.

Matson is bordered primarily by Robinswood Hill, a large hill that rises to 283 metres above sea level. Much of Matson is built on the sides of the hill, which features the Gloucester Ski Centre.

In 2017, Matson was the site of a near-fatal "hit and run" incident. Local resident Delroy Nelson bought a car so that he could drive over his former partner in an attempt to kill her. The incident was motivated by Mr Nelson being denied access to a sum of criminal proceeds that had been kept in a shared bank account.

The Matson estate, along with neighbouring area to the north of the estate, Tredworth has the highest crime rate within the City of Gloucester. Antisocial behaviour, drug addiction and more recently (especially in the Tredworth area) knife crime associated with street gangs.

Celebrity chef Tom Kerridge named his "expensive" curry sauce after the sauce that he used to buy from his local chipshop on the Matson estate.

References 

Areas of Gloucester
Former civil parishes in Gloucestershire